Sphinx dollii, or Doll's sphinx moth, is a moth of the family Sphingidae. It is known from arid brushlands and desert foothills from Nevada and southern California east through Utah, Arizona, Colorado, and from New Mexico to Oklahoma and Texas.

The wingspan is 45–63 mm. There is one generation with adults on wing from June to August.

The larvae feed on Juniperus species, including Juniperus deppeana.

References

External links
Doll's  Sphinx Moths of North America Guide

Sphinx (genus)
Moths of North America
Fauna of the Colorado Desert
Fauna of the Mojave Desert
Moths described in 1881